Calhoun County School District is a school district headquartered in Blountstown, Florida. It serves Calhoun County.

Schools
K-12:
 Altha Public School

High school:
 Blountstown High School

K-8 schools:
 Carr Elementary & Middle School

Middle schools:
 Blountstown Middle School

Elementary schools:
 Blountstown Elementary School

References

External links
 
School districts in Florida
Education in Calhoun County, Florida